The St. Joseph Observatory (OSJ) is an amateur astronomy observatory located in Buenos Aires, Argentina. It was founded in 1913, but was initially constructed in 1870. It is the oldest astronomical observatory in Buenos Aires which still remains in activity.
The institution currently performs research and recreational activities for the public as courses or seminars.

Technical Means 
St. Joseph Observatory (OSJ) has several sections for education, outreach, and astronomical observation.
For its unique location in the central tower of the St. Joseph school, its structure is vertical type, where a section succeeds another in the subsequent floor, accessed by a centennial all wooden staircase tower type.

Astronomical Observatory 
Fitted in the center of the block comprising St. Joseph school and the Church of Our Lady is Balvanera Observatory Tower, at the top stands the dome swivel with 5 meters in diameter houses; it is the main instrument of the Observatory.

Mailhat ecuatorial telescope  
The equatorial telescope, manufactured by Raymond Augustin Mailhat, is the main instrument of the St. Joseph Observatory. The telescope is a refractor astro-chart of 1990 mm focal length of 127 mm opening in each tube, the original system of weights and watch Watt regulator was replaced by an electric synchronous motor for easy tracking of the stars
The original eye missing, they were replaced by modern Meade eyepieces of different focal lengths.
The origin of this instrument is French and was delivered to the centre as a donation by Mr. Sinforozo Molina, parent of a student in the early twentieth century
The German-type equatorial mount supports two twins one tubes suitable for visual observation and one for photography, the latter had a mechanical tube for making glass photographic plates currently in the room old instruments because it was replaced by a modern CCD camera
During the subsequent amendments that were made to keep using the old telescope sought to minimize the impact of the change being able to maintain the original look of this unique instrument.

CCD camera 
It has an S-Big ST7 camera that associated equatorial lower instruments or photographic lens allows observation multitask as astronomical photography and supernova search

Bretón Telescope 
Old altazimuth refractor used for basic education

Classroom 
The room under the dome to dictate the various courses of astronomy, with a capacity for 20 people it is equipped with various media and tools built demonstration by members of the observatory that allow virtually experience the various astronomical phenomena

Old instruments room 
In it are preserved many instruments used in astronomical research and teaching, they were restored and classified over the years by members of the Observatory Currently you can see also web OSJ Antiguos Instrumentos

Workshop 
Also officiating as usual meeting room, the workshop is repaired where most instruments are prepared and samples classes open to the public, as well as new instruments to be used in demo them.

Activities 
Over the years there have been various activities related to astronomy: observation of sunspots, variable star observing, astrophotography, supernova search, observation of comets, occultations, teaching courses, the public open days, etc.
Undoubtedly the main activity of the Observatory San Jose, faithful to the purpose for which it was founded, is the teaching and dissemination of astronomy.

Courses 
Throughout the year various courses are offered in the concurrent participating can go to get a thorough idea of how the universe is made, the means of observation and adventure meant for man to unravel the mysteries of the cosmos The aim is to achieve a theoretical-practical observations each topic bound to chords astromomicas ephemeris time.

 Observational Astronomy
 Telescopes
 Astronomy History
 Solar System
 Stellar Astronomy

Notes & References

External links 
Official page of Observatorio San José "OSJ"
 Look at the stars, a habit that grows between the locals (http://www.clarin.com/ciudades/Mirar-estrellas-habito-crece-portenos_0_1019298108.html)

Astronomical observatories in Argentina
1870 establishments in Argentina
Buildings and structures in Buenos Aires